Steve is a masculine given name, usually a short form (hypocorism) of Steven or Stephen.

Notable people with the name include:
 Steve Abbott (disambiguation), several people
 Steve Adams (disambiguation), several people
 Steve Alaimo (born 1939), American singer, record & TV producer, label owner 
 Steve Albini (born 1961), American musician, record producer, audio engineer, and music journalist
 Steve Allen (1921–2000), American television personality, musician, composer, comedian and writer
 Steve Armitage (born 1944), British-born Canadian sports reporter
 Steve Armstrong (born 1965), American professional wrestler
 Steve Antin  (born 1958), American actor
 Steve Augarde (born 1950), British author and artist
 Steve Augeri (born 1959), American singer 
 Steve August (born 1954), American football player
 Stone Cold Steve Austin (born 1964), American professional wrestler
 Steve Aylett (born 1967), English author of satirical science fiction, fantasy, and slipstream
 Steve Backshall (born 1973), English naturalist, writer and television presenter
 Steve Baker (disambiguation), several people
 Steve Ballmer (born 1956), American businessman, CEO of Microsoft (2000–2014) and owner of the Los Angeles Clippers
 Steve Bannon (born 1953), American media executive, political strategist, and former investment banker
 Steve Barker (disambiguation), several people
 Steve Bartek (born 1952), American guitarist, film composer, conductor, and orchestrator
 Steve Bartelstein, American television journalist and umpire
 Steve Bays, Canadian musician, audio engineer, and producer
 Steve Beauharnais (born 1990), American football player
 Steve Belkin (born 1947), American businessman, former team owner
 Steve Belles (born 1966), American football player
 Steve Berman, American editor and novelist
 Steve W. Berman, American lawyer
 Steve Beshear (born 1944), American attorney and politician
 Steve Biko (1946–1977), South African anti-apartheid activist
 Steve Billirakis (born 1986), American poker player
 Steve Binder (born 1932), American producer and director
 Steve Birnbaum (born 1991), American soccer player
 Steve Bjorklund (born c. 1960), American musician 
 Steve Blackman (born 1963), American martial arts instructor, bail bondsman, and former professional wrestler
 Steve Blackman (writer), Canadian television writer, and executive producer
 Steve Blum (born 1960), American voice actor
 Steve Booker (producer), British music producer, songwriter and musician
 Steve Boone (born 1943), American bass guitarist and music producer, who is both a founding member and current member of the Folk-Rock group The Lovin' Spoonful
 Steve Bradley (1975–2008), American professional wrestler 
 Steve Breitkreuz (born 1992), German professional footballer
 Steve Bren (born 1960), American racing driver and real estate developer
 Steve Brewer (born 1957), American author
 Steve Broderick (born 1981), vocalist
 Steve Brodie (disambiguation), several people
 Steve Brodner (born 1954), American editorial cartoonist, editor, and producer
 Steve Brown (disambiguation), several people
 Steve Buccellato (born 1968), American comic artist, writer, and editor
 Steve Bullock (British politician) (born 1954), first directly elected mayor of the London Borough of Lewisham
 Steve Bullock (American politician) (born 1966), Governor of Montana, USA
 Steve Buttle (1953–2012), English professional midfielder 
 Steve Burns (born 1973), American actor, filmmaker, and musician
 Steve Burton (disambiguation), several people
 Steve Burtt Jr., American-Ukrainian basketball player who played in and Israeli league
 Steve Buscemi (born 1957), American actor, director, producer, writer, and former firefighter
 Steve Callaghan, American screenwriter, producer, and voice actor
 Steve Cannon (radio) (1927–2009), American radio personality and TV host
 Steve Cannon (writer) (1935–2019), American writer
 Steve Cantwell (born 1986), American mixed martial arts fighter
 Steve Cardenas (born 1974), American martial artist and actor
 Steve Carell (born 1962), American actor, comedian, director, producer and writer
 Steve Carroll, American sports broadcaster
 Steve Carter (disambiguation), several people
 Steve Carver (1945–2021), American filmmaker
 Steve Case (born 1958), American entrepreneur and businessman, founder of America Online
 Steve Casey (1908–1987), Irish sport rower and professional wrestler
 Steve Centanni, American former news reporter for Fox News Channel
 Steve Cohen (judoka) (born 1955), American Olympic judoka
 Steve Chappell, American aerospace engineer, mountain climber and aquanaut
 Steve Clark (disambiguation), several people
 Steve Coleman (born 1956), American saxophonist
 Steve Coleman (American football) (born 1950), American football player
 Steve Collins (born 1964), Irish former professional boxer
 Steve Conway (politician) (born 1944), American politician
 Steve Conway (singer) (1920–1952), British singer
 Steve Condos (1918–1990), American tap dancer
 Steve Coogan (born 1965), English actor, comedian, producer and screenwriter
 Steve Cooley (born 1947), American lawyer, politician, and former prosecutor
 Steve Corino (born 1973), Canadian semi-retired professional wrestler
 Steve Coulter, NASCAR team owner
 Steve Cox (disambiguation), several people
 Steve Davis (born 1957), British snooker player
 Steve Dee, American disc jockey and innovator
 Steve DiSalvo (born 1949), American retired professional wrestler
 Steve Doll (1960–2009), American professional wrestler
 Steve Doocy (born 1956), American television host, political commentator, and author
 Steve Dubbeldam, Canadian-American entrepreneur and fashion designer
 Steve Dubinsky (born 1970), Canadian hockey player
 Steve Dublanica (born 1968), American author and blogger
 Steve Duemig (1954–2019), American sports media personality 
 Steve Dunleavy (1938–2019), Australian journalist
 Steve Earle (born 1955), American singer-songwriter, record producer, author, and actor
 Steve Earle (footballer) (born 1945), English former footballer 
 Steve Edge (born 1972), English actor, writer, and comedian
 Steve Erickson (born 1950), American novelist
 Steve Evans (disambiguation), several people
 Steve Ferrone (born 1950), English drummer and radio host
 Steve Fisk, American audio engineer, record producer, and musician
 Steve Foley (disambiguation), several people
 Steve Fonyo (1965–2022), Canadian runner 
 Steve Fossett (1944–2007), American businessman
 Steve Fox (disambiguation), several people
 Steve Galluccio (born 1960), Canadian screenwriter and playwright
 Steve Garvey (disambiguation), several people
 Steve Gawley (born 1952), special effects artist and voice actor
 Steve George (born 1955), American musician and singer 
 Steve Gibson (disambiguation), several people
 Steve Gilliard (1964–2007), American journalist and blogger 
 Steve Gohouri (1981–2015), Ivorian professional footballer 
 Steve Gomer, American film and television director
 Steve Gonzalez (born 1980), American soccer player
 Steve Gonzalez (American football) (born 1981), American football player
 Steve Goodman (1948–1984), American folk and country singer-songwriter
 Steve Gorman (born 1965), American musician and radio host.
 Steve Gottlieb (disambiguation), several people
 Steve or Steven Gray (disambiguation), several people
 Steve Griffin (born 1964), American football player
 Steve Hadley (disambiguation), several people
 Steve Handelsman (born 1948), American journalist
 Steve Harley (born 1951), British singer and songwriter, lead singer of Cockney Rebel
 Steve Harris (disambiguation), several people
 Steve Harvey (born 1957), American TV and radio personality
 Steve Harwell (born 1967), American retired singer and musician
 Steve High, American former women's basketball coach
 Steve Hockensmith (born 1968), American author
 Steve Hoffman (disambiguation), several people
 Steve Holt (American musician), guitarist for the band 36 Crazyfists
 Steve Holt (Canadian musician) (born 1954), Canadian musician
 Steve Howe (baseball) (1958–2006), American baseball player 
 Steve Howe (musician) (born 1947), English guitarist
 Steve Huebert (born 1959), Kansas state legislator
 Steve Hughes, Australian-born drummer, comedian and actor
 Steve Huison (born 1962), British actor
 Steve "Silk" Hurley (born 1962), American club DJ, producer, and songwriter
 Steve Ishmael (born 1995), American football player
 Steve Irwin (disambiguation), several people
 Steve Jackson (disambiguation), several people
 Steve Jobs (1955–2011), American entrepreneur and co-founder of Apple Inc
 Steve Johnson (disambiguation), several people
 Steve Jones (disambiguation), several people
 Steve Jordan (disambiguation), several people
 Steve Julian (1958–2016), American radio broadcaster, actor, and playwright
 Steve Kangas (1961–1999), American journalist, political activist, and chess teacher
 Steve Kaplan, American-Israeli basketball player 
 Steve Kazee (born 1975), American actor and singer
 Steve Kearns (born 1956), Canadian football player
 Steve Keirn (born 1951), American retired professional wrestler
 Steve Kekana (1958–2021), South African singer/songwriter
 Steve Kelley, American editorial cartoonist, comic strip creator, comedian, and writer
 Steve Kenyon (born 1951), English long-distance runner
 Steve King  (born 1949), American politician and businessman
 Steve Kirby (cricketer), English cricketer
 Steve T. Kirby (born 1952), Lieutenant Governor of South Dakota
 Steve Klein, several people
 Steve Knapp (born 1964), American IndyCar driver
 Steve Komphela (born 1967), South African association footballer
 Steve Kowit (1938–2015), American poet, essayist, educator, and human-rights advocate
 Steve Krisiloff (born 1946), American racing driver
 Steve Krulevitz (born 1951), American tennis player
 Steve Kubby (1946–2022), Libertarian Party activist
 Steve Kuhn (born 1938), American pianist, composer, arranger, bandleader, and educator
 Steve Lacy (disambiguation), several people
 Steve Landesberg (1936–2010), American actor and comedian 
 Steve J. Langdon (born 1948), American anthropologist
 Steve Largent (born 1954), American football player and politician
 Steve Lawler (wrestler) (1965–2021), American wrestler and trainer
 Steve Lekoelea (born 1979), South African association footballer
 Steve Lemmens (1972–2016), Belgian snooker player
 Steve Leung (born 1957), Hong Kong architect and designer
 Steve Light (born 1970), author and illustrator of children's books
 Steve Lightfoot, a British television writer and producer
 Steve Lightle (1959–2021), American comics artist
 Steve Little (disambiguation), several people
 Steve Lombardi (born 1961), American professional wrestler 
 Steve Longa (born 1994), American football player
 Steve Lyons (writer), British writer
 Steve Lyons (baseball) (born 1960), American baseball player and announcer/analyst
 Steve MacGordon (1892–1916), American early aviator
 Steve Madden (born 1958), American fashion designer and businessman, founder and CEO of Steve Madden Ltd
 Steve Madere, American business executive 
 Steve Malovic (1956–2007), American-Israeli basketball player
 Steve Mandanda (born 1985), French footballer
 Steve Mantis  (born 1950), Canadian advocate
 Steve Marcus (1939–2005), American jazz saxophonist
 Steve Mark (1966–2016), Grenadian international footballer 
 Steve Marker (born 1959), American musician, songwriter, and record producer
 Steve Markle, Canadian filmmaker, actor, writer, editor, and producer
 Steve Marmel (born 1964), American television writer, producer, and stand-up comedian 
 Steve Marmion, English theatre director
 Steve Marriner (born 1984), Canadian musician, singer, songwriter, and record producer
 Steve Marshall (born 1964), American lawyer and politician
 Steve Martin (born 1945), American comedian
 Steve Matai (born 1984), New Zealand rugby player
 Steve Mazan (born 1970), American stand-up comedian, TV writer, and author
 Steve McCutcheon (born 1972), British record producer, songwriter, and musician
 Steve McDonald (disambiguation), several people
 Steve McMichael (born 1957), American former professional football player, sports broadcaster, and professional wrestler
 Steve McNicholas (born 1955), English director, composer, actor, and dance group founder
 Steve McQueen (1930–1980), American actor
 Steve Miller (disambiguation), several people
 Steve Miner (born 1951), American director of film and television, and film producer
 Steve Moore (disambiguation), several people
 Steve Nash (born 1974), Canadian basketball coach and player
 Steve Nemeth (born 1967), Canadian ice hockey player
 Steve Nemeth (gridiron football) (1922–1998), American football player
 Steve Nguyen (born 1985), Vietnamese-American director, writer, artist, and film producer
 Steve Nickles, American lawyer and professor
 Steve Novick (born 1963), American politician, attorney, and activist
 Steve O'Donnell (born 1954), American television writer
 Steve Orlando, American comic book writer
 Steve Owen (disambiguation), several people
 Steve Owens (disambiguation), several people
 Steve Parker (disambiguation), several people
 Steve Patterson (disambiguation), several people
 Steve Perry (disambiguation), several people
 Steve Perryman (born 1951), English former professional footballer
 Steve Peterson (1950–2008), American technical director for NASCAR
 Steve Pierce (born 1950), American state politician
 Steve Pink (born 1966), American actor, director and writer
 Steve Post (1944–2014), American radio host
 Steve Rackman, English-born Australian actor and professional wrestler
 Steve Rash, American film director and producer
 Steve Reinke (born 1963), Canadian video artist and filmmaker
 Steve Rifkind (born 1962), American music entrepreneur and investor
 Steve Robinson (disambiguation), several people
 Steve Rodehutskors (1963–2007), Canadian football player
 Steve Rohr, American communication expert, educator, public relations executive, and author
 Steve Rubel, American public relations executive and blogger
 Steve Rubell (1943–1989), American nightclub owner, former co-owner of Studio 54
 Steve Russell (disambiguation), several people
 Steve Sailer (born 1958), American paleoconservative journalist, movie critic, blogger, and columnist
 Steve Sanders (born 1939), American martial artist and police officer
 Steve Sawyer, several people
 Steve Sarowitz (born 1965/1966), American billionaire, founder of Paylocity 
 Steve Scalise (born 1965), American Congressman
 Steve Schlachter (born 1954), American-Israeli basketball player
 Steve Serio (born 1987), American wheelchair basketball player
 Steve Sheldon, American politician
 Steve Shelton (born 1949), American racing driver
 Steve Shenbaum, American former actor
 Steve Shutt (born 1952), Canadian former professional ice hockey player and NHL Hall of Famer 
 Steven Shields (born 1972), Canadian hockey player
 Steve Silberman, American author and editor
 Steve or Steven Smith (disambiguation), several people
 Steve Smoger (1950–2022), American boxing & kickboxing referee
 Steve Soffa, American jewelry designer
 Steve Brantley Spence (born 1989), American football player and federal convict
 Steve Squyres (born 1957), American astronomer
 Steve Stenger, Democrat politician and County Executive of St. Louis County
 Steve Stevaert (1954–2015), Belgian politician
 Steve Stivers (born 1965), American Congressman
 Steve Stone (disambiguation), several people
 Steve Swaja, American dragster designer
 Steve Swallow (born 1940), American musician and composer 
 Steve Swindal, American businessman
 Steve Swindall (born 1982), Scottish rugby player
 Steve Swindells (born 1952), English singer-songwriter
 Steve Talley (born 1981), American actor 
 Steve Tannen  (born 1968), American singer-songwriter
 Steve Tannen (American football) (born 1948), American former college and professional football player 
 Steve Tarvin (born 1951), American politician
 Steve Tasker (born 1962), American sports reporter
 Steve Travis (born 1951), American retired singer-songwriter, musician, recording artist and author
 Steve Trilling (1902–1964), American film studio producer and executive 
 Steve Tshwete (1938–2001), South African politician
 Steve Vai (born 1960), American guitarist, composer, songwriter, and producer
 Steve Vaus, American recording artist and politician
 Steve Valentine (born 1966), Scottish actor and magician
 Steve Wall, (fl. 1980's -), Irish actor and musician
 Steve Walsh (disambiguation), several people
 Steve Weisberg (born 1963), American composer, pianist, recording artist, and producer
 Steve Weissman, American sportscaster 
 Steve White (disambiguation), several people
 Steve Whitmire (born 1959), American puppeteer
 Steve Wilkos (born 1964), American talk-show host
 Steve Williams (disambiguation), several people
 Steve Winn (born 1981), Welsh rugby union player
 Steve Winwood (born 1948), English singer
 Steve Woodmore (born 1959), British electronics salesman
 Steve Wozniak (born 1950), American co-founder of Apple Inc
 Steve Yeager (born 1948), American baseball player
 Steve Young (born 1961), American football player
 Steve Zatylny, Canadian football player
 Steve Zuckerman (born 1947), American television and theater director

In fiction
 Steve, a character in the American TV sitcom Will & Grace
 Steve, a minor character in the American animated TV series The Owl House
 Steve, a character played by Christian Tessier in the 1992 movie Eli's Lesson
 Steve, one of the main protagonists and default player characters in the game Minecraft
 Steve, played by Michael Salami in the British web series Corner Shop Show
 Steve the Pirate, a character from the 2004 film DodgeBall: A True Underdog Story
 Steve Austin, the lead character in the TV series The Six Million Dollar Man
 Steve Bolander, a character in the 1973 American coming-of-age comedy-drama movie American Graffiti
 Steve Fox, a character from the Tekken fighting game series
 Steve Frazelli, in the film The Italian Job
 Steve Freeling, in the films Poltergeist and Poltergeist II: The Other Side
 Steve Hale, in the American sitcom Full House
 Steve Harrington, in the Netflix series Stranger Things
 Steve Hicks, one of the title characters in the 2005 American romantic comedy movie Adam & Steve
 Steve Hightower, a character from the television series The Steve Harvey Show
 Steve Holt (Arrested Development), in the Fox TV series Arrested Development
 Steve Jackson, a minor character in the 1985 American science fantasy movie Explorers
 Steve Johnson (Days of Our Lives), in the American soap opera Days of Our Lives
 Steve McDonald, in the British soap opera Coronation Street
 Steve McGarrett, a character from the television series Hawaii Five-O
 Steve Miller, a character from the 2010 drama film The Last Song
 Steve Owen (EastEnders), on the British soap opera EastEnders
 Steve Randle, a character from the 1983 film The Outsiders
 Steve Riggs, a character in 1989 American-Canadian fantasy drama movie Prancer
 Steve Rogers, the civilian alias of Captain America
 Steve Sanders, in the TV series Beverly Hills, 90210
 Steve Smith, a character from the animated television series American Dad!
 Steven "Steve" Stevens, a character from the television program Even Stevens and 2003 film The Even Stevens Movie
 Steve Stifler, a character from the American Pie series
 Steve Stronghold, a character from the 2005 film Sky High
 Steve Taylor, in the 2008 British slasher movie Eden Lake
 Steve Toyota, in the 1992 TV comedy movie Revenge of the Nerds III
 Steve Trevor, in the DC Comics and 1970s television series Wonder Woman
 Steve Urkel, in the TV series Family Matters
 Steve Zissou, a character from the 2004 film The Life Aquatic with Steve Zissou

See also
 Steeve, given name
 Stevie (given name)
 List of people with given name Stephen
 
 

Given names
Masculine given names
English masculine given names
Hypocorisms
Lists of people by given name